The highest level of provincial rugby union in Australia is Super Rugby. There are five Australian teams in this competition, which also features teams from New Zealand and Fiji.

Australia currently has no national club competition. The first attempt at such a competition, the Australian Rugby Championship, was launched in 2007 with eight teams, but lasted only one season before the nation's governing body, the Australian Rugby Union (now Rugby Australia), decided to discontinue the competition due to financial losses. The second and most recent attempt at forming a national domestic league, the National Rugby Championship, was launched in 2014 with nine teams and lasted six years until it was disbanded in 2020. The current top level competitions in Australia are the Shute Shield in Sydney and the Queensland Premier League in Brisbane. Numerous club and representative competitions serve the rugby playing community below these two competitions.

Super Rugby
New South Wales Waratahs
Queensland Reds
Brumbies
Melbourne Rebels
Western Force

National Competitions

National Rugby Championship
The National Rugby Championship (2014−2020) was a former annual competition held between professional teams from each state.
 Brisbane City
 Canberra Vikings
 Melbourne Rising
 New South Wales Country Eagles
 Western Force
 Queensland Country
 Sydney Rays

Former:
 Sydney Stars (2014–2015)
 Perth Spirit (2014–2017)
 Greater Sydney Rams (2014–2017)

Australian Rugby Shield/NRC Division 2
The Australian Rugby Shield (2000-2008) and NRC Division 2 (2018-2020) were former annual competitions held between amateur representative teams from each state.
ACT & Southern NSW Vikings (only in Australian Rugby Shield)
Adelaide Black Falcons
Northern Territory Mosquitoes
Victoria Country Barbarians (formerly Melbourne Axemen)
New South Wales Country Cockatoos
Perth Gold
Queensland Country Heelers
Tasmania Jack Jumpers

New South Wales and ACT

New South Wales Rugby Union

Shute Shield
 Eastern Suburbs
 Eastwood
 Gordon
 Hunter Wildfires
 Manly
 Northern Suburbs
 Parramatta
 Randwick
 Southern Districts
 Sydney University
 Warringah
 West Harbour

Former:
 Central Coast Waves
 Canberra Kookaburras
 Penrith

New South Wales Country Rugby Union

Central Coast Rugby Union
Avoca Beach 
Gosford 	
Kariong 	 
Northlakes United 	
Ourimbah Razorbacks

Terrigal 	 
The Entrance 	 
Warnervale 	
Woy Woy

Central Northern Rugby Union
Barraba Rams & Gwydir River Rats
Gunnedah Red Devils 
Inverell Highlanders 
Moree Weebolla Bulls
Narrabri Blue Boars 
Quirindi Lions	 
Scone Brumbies
Tamworth Pirates
Walcha Rams

Former:
Tamworth Magpies
Croppa Creek Crows

Central West Rugby Union
Bathurst Bulldogs 	 
Bathurst City 	 
Blayney 	 
Canowindra Pythons
Coolah 	 
Coonabarabran Kookaburras	 
Cowra Eagles	 
CSU - Bathurst 	 
Cudal Cobras
Dubbo Kangaroos	 
Dubbo Rhinos 	 
Forbes Platypi	 
Geurie Goats Rugby Club 	 
Molong Magpies	 
Mudgee Wombats	 
Narromine Gorillas	 	 
Orange City 	 
Orange Emus 	 
Orange Waratahs 	 
Parkes Boars
Trangie Tigers	 
USO - Orange 	 
Wellington Redbacks	 
Yeoval
Former:
Blackheath Wildfires
Cudal
Lithgow Devils
Oberon
Rydal Razorbacks

Far North Coast Rugby Union
Ballina  	 
Bangalow 	 
Byron Bay 	 
Casino
Casuarina
Evans River 	 
Iluka 	 
Kyogle 	 
Lennox Head 	 
Lismore 	 
Mullumbimby 
Murwillumbah
Richmond Range 	 
Southern Cross University	 	 
Wollongbar/Alstonville
Woolgoolga Whitepointers 	 
Yamba

South Coast Monaro Rugby Union
This union is officially affiliated with the ACT and Southern NSW Rugby Union instead of the NSW union.
Batemans Bay  	 
Braidwood 	 
Broulee 	 
Sharks 	 
Ulladulla 	 
Vincentia

Illawarra Rugby Union
Albion Park
Avondale  
Bowral 
Bundanoon 	 
Camden Rams 
Lions Rugby  	 
Kiama 
Shamrocks 	 
Shoalhaven 	 
Tech Waratahs 
University
Vikings 
Wollondilly

Mid North Coast Rugby Union
Coffs Harbour Snappers and Marlins
Hastings Valley Vikings
Kempsey Cannonballs 
Port Macquarie Pirates
Bowraville Goannas
Bishop-Druit College Coffs Harbour Barracudas
Former:
Wauchope Thunder
 Urunga-Bellinger valley rugby club
 Nambucca River Breakers R.U.F.C

New England Rugby Union
Glen Innes  	 
Robb Rugby Club
St Albert's College
The Armidale Rugby Club (Blues)
Guyra Ghosts
Barbarians R.U.F.C.
Wright College Redmen 
Tamworth 

Former:
Armidale City
Armidale Old Boys
City United 
Earle Page College 
Guy Fawkes Ebor
Gwydir River Rats 
Hillgrove
Page-Wright Barbarians 
Teachers College 
Tenterfield Bumblebees
University College
United Colleges
Uralla Miners
Walcha Rams

City-United Historical note:  During the 1994 pre-season, it became clear that neither United nor Armidale City would have enough players to field four grades or be competitive. Given that quite a few of City's squad were former United players, NERU Secretary and former United President Dick Croft encouraged the two clubs to join forces, and City United was born. The new club competed strongly for the next eight years before merging with Armidale Old Boys for the 2002 season. This resulted in the new Armidale Blues Rugby Club, which combines the history and tradition of City, the professionalism and competitiveness of Old Boys, and the spirit and student depth of United.

Newcastle and Hunter Rugby Union
Singleton
Nelson Bay
Waratahs
Wanderers
Merewether Carlton Rugby Club
Hamilton Hawks
University
Maitland
Lake Macquarie
Southern Beaches
Muswellbrook
Pokolbin
Southern Lakes
Griffins

Southern Inland Rugby Union
This union is also affiliated with the ACT union instead of a NSW body.

Western Plains Rugby Union

Bourke Rams
Brewarrina Brumbies
Cobar Camels
Coonamble Rams
Gulargambone Galahs
Bogan Bulls (Nyngan)
Walgett Rams
Warren Pumas

New South Wales Suburban Rugby Union

First Division
 Balmain
 Colleagues 
 Drummoyne 
 Knox 
 Lindfield
 Mosman 
 Petersham
 St Patrick's

Second Division
 Barker Old Boys
 Blue Mountains
 Forest 
 Hills
 Hunters Hill 
 Newport
 University of New South Wales Rugby union Club
 Waverley

Third Division
 Beecroft 
 Brothers 
 Epping 
 Hawkesbury Valley
 Kings Old Boys
 Oatley
 Old Ignatians
 Redfield Old Boys
 St Ives 
 UWS Hawkesbury

Fourth Division
 Blacktown
 Briars 
 Canterbury
 Colleagues Convicts
 Macquarie Uni 
 Rouse Hill
 Sydney Harlequins
 Sydney Irish

Fifth Division
not contested

Sixth Division

 North-West
 Chatswood
 Collaroy
 Dee Why
 ICMS
 Lane Cove
 Manly Savers
 Merrylands (TBC)
 Roseville
 Terrey Hills
 Wakehurst

South-East
 Alexandria
 Engadine
 Burraneer
 Clovelly
 Fairvale/Lansvale
 Maccabi
 Menai
 Wollondilly

Australian Capital Territory (including areas of southern New South Wales)

ACT and Southern NSW Rugby Union

ACTRU Premier Division

Easts
Gungahlin Eagles
Queanbeyan Whites
Canberra Royals
Tuggeranong Vikings
Uni-Norths Owls
Wests Lions

The following teams compete in first and second division competitions
 Boorowa Rugby Club
 Bungendore RUFC
 Cooma Rugby Club
 Crookwell Rugby Club
 Defence Academy Rugby Club
 Goulburn Rugby Union
 Hall Rugby Club
 Harden RUFC
 Jindabyne Rugby Club
 RMC Rugby Club
 Taralga RUFC
 Yass RUFC

South Coast Zone

 Batemans Bay RUFC
 Bega Valley RUFC
 Bermagui-Cobargo Sharks RC
 Bombala Rugby Club
 Braidwood RUFC
 Broulee Dolphins RUFC
 Milton Rugby Club
 Narooma & Districts Whales RC

Southern Inland Zone

 Albury-Wodonga RUFC
 Cootamundra RUFC
 Denilquin Drovers
 Grenfell Rugby Club
 Griffith RUFC
 Hay Cutters
 Leeton Phantoms RUFC
 Rivcoll Red RUFC
 Temora RUFC
 Tumut RUFC
 Wagga Agricultural College RUFC
 Wagga City RUFC
 Wagga Wagga Crows Junior Rugby Union
 Wagga Waratahs RUFC
 West Wyalong Junior Rugby Union
 Young RUFC

Northern Territory

Northern Territory Rugby Union

Darwin Club Rugby
'A' & 'B' grade competition:
 Casuarina Cougars
 Darwin Dragons
 Palmerston Crocs
 South Darwin Rabbitohs
 Swampdogs
 University Pirates

Central Australian Rugby Union
 Alice Springs Dingo Cubs
 Devils Rugby Union Football Club
 Alice Springs Eagles
 Kiwi Warriors RUFC

Katherine Rugby Union
 Barbarians Rugby Union Football Club
 Brahmans Rugby Union Football Club
 Pirates Rugby Union Football Club
 Tindal Lions Rugby Union Football Club

Other teams
 East Arnhem Rugby
East Arnhem Rugby runs a junior rugby competition between April and August. While not part of a regular competition, East Arnhem Rugby provides competition for Senior Players by entering in 7's Tournaments.

Queensland

Queensland Rugby Union

Queensland Premier Rugby
Brothers Old Boys
Easts Tigers Rugby Union
Bond University Rugby Club
GPS
North Brisbane Rugby Club 
Souths 
Sunnybank Rugby Union Club 
University of Queensland Rugby Club 
Wests

Queensland Country Rugby Union

Bundaberg and District Rugby Union
 Alloway Falcons
 Bundaberg Barbarians
 East Coast Buccaneers
 Isis Crushers

Cairns and District Rugby Union
 Barron-Trinity Bulls
 Brothers Rugby Union (Cairns)
 Cairns Old Crocs Rugby Union
 Cairns Wanderers
 Innisfail & District Rugby
 JCU Mariners
 Port Douglas Rugby Union
 Southside Crusaders Sports & Culture
 Tablelands Rugby

Central Highlands Rugby Union
 Capella Rugby Union
 Clermont Rugby Union
 Emerald Rugby
 Moranbah Bulls
 Rolleston Rugby Union

Central Queensland Rugby Union
 Biloela Rugby
 Blackwater Rugby
 Brothers Rugby Union (Rockhampton)
 Capricorn Coast Rugby
 Colts Rugby Club
 Dawson Valley Rugby Club
 Frenchville Pioneers
 Gladstone Rugby Club
 Mount Morgan Rugby
 Rockhampton Boars
 University Central Queensland Rugby

Darling Downs Rugby Union
 Condamine Rugby Union
 Dalby and District Rugby Union Football Club
 Goondiwindi Rugby
 Highfields Redbacks Rugby Union
 Roma Rugby Union
 South Burnett Rugby
 St George & District Rugby
 Toowoomba Bears Rugby
 Toowoomba Rangers Rugby
 University Of Southern Queensland Rugby
 Warwick & Districts Rugby

Mackay District Rugby Union
 Bowen Rugby
 Brothers Rugby Union (Mackay)
 City Rugby Club (Mackay)
 Kuttabul Rugby
 Proserpine/Whitsunday Rugby Union
 Slade Point Rugby

Mt Isa Rugby Union
 Cloncurry Rugby
 Euros Rugby Union
 Keas Rugby
 Warrigals Rugby

Gold Coast District Rugby Union
 Beaudesert Rugby Football Club
 Bond University Rugby Club
 Bond Pirates Rugby Club
 Casuarina Beach Rugby Club
 Colleges Rugby Club
 Coolangatta Tweed Barbarians
 Coomera Crushers RU
 Gold Coast Eagles
 Griffith University Colleges Knights Rugby Union Club
 Helensvale Hogs RUC
 Hinterland Celtics Rugby Club
 Nerang Bulls RUC
 Palm Beach Currumbin Alleygators RUC
 Surfers Paradise Dolphins
 Tamborine Mountain Rugby

Sunshine Coast Rugby Union
 Caboolture Rugby Union
 Caloundra Rugby Union
 Fraser Coast Rugby Union
 Gympie Rugby Union
 Maroochydore Rugby Union
 Nambour Rugby Union
 Noosa District Rugby Union
 University of the Sunshine Coast Rugby Union

Townsville and Districts Rugby Union
 Brothers Rugby Union (Townsville)
 Burdekin Rugby Union
 Charters Towers Rugby Union
 Ingham Rugby Union
 James Cook University of North Queensland Rugby Union
 North Ward Old Boys Rugby
 Ross River Redskins
 Teachers West Rugby Union
 Western Suburbs Rugby Union

Western Queensland Rugby Union
 Barcaldine Rugby Union
 Collegians Rugby Union
 Longreach Rugby Union

Queensland Suburban Rugby Union
List does not include Queensland Premier Rugby clubs that also field teams in the Suburban competitions.
 Ag Vet Rugby Union 
 Beenleigh and District Rugby Union
 Brisbane Irish Rugby Football Club
 Easts Longhorns Rugby Union 
 Everton Park Rugby Union 
 Goodna Rugby Union 
 Ipswich Rangers Rugby Club
 Logan City Rugby Union 
 Med XV Rugby Union 
 Nerang Rugby Union 
 Pine Rivers Boars Rugby Union 
 Pine Rivers Pumas Rugby Union 
 Redcliffe Rugby Union 
 Redlands Rugby Union
 Riverside Rugby Union Club
 Southern Bay Rugby Union 
 Springfield Rugby Union 
 St Leo's College Old Boys Rugby Union 
 TC Beirne School of Law Rugby Union 
 UQ - Gatton Rugby Union 
 Wynnum Rugby Union Club

South Australia

Rugby Union South Australia

SA Club Rugby
 Adelaide University RUFC
 Barossa Rams RUFC
 Brighton RUFC
 Burnside RUFC
 Elizabeth RUFC
 North East Districts RUFC
 North Torrens RUFC
 Old Collegians Rugby Club
 Onkaparinga RUFC
 Port Adelaide RUFC
 Souths Suburbs RUFC
 Woodville RUFC

Tasmania

Tasmanian Rugby Union
Australian Maritime College Rugby Union Club
Burnie Emus
Devonport Bulls
Eastern Suburbs Roosters 
Glenorchy Stags 
Hobart Harlequins 
Hobart Lions
Launceston Bees
Taroona Blues
University of Tasmania Redmen

Victoria

Rugby Victoria
 Victorian Club Rugby
 Ballarat Rugby Union Football Club 
 Bendigo Rugby Club
 Border Army RUFC
 Boroondara RUFC
 Box Hill Rugby Club
 Cerberus RUFC
 Cobram Rugby Union Club
 Deniliquin RUFC
 Echuca Moama Barbarians
 Eltham Rugby Club
 Endeavour Hills Rugby Club
 Footscray Rugby Club
 Geelong Rugby Club
 Harlequin Rugby Club
 Maroondah RUFC
 Melbourne Rugby Union Football Club
 Melbourne University Rugby Football Club
 Melton Rugby Club
 Monash University Rugby Club
 Moorabbin Rugby Club
 Northern Rugby Club
 Power House Rugby Club
 Puckapunyal Rugby Club
 Shepparton Rugby Union Club
 Southern Districts RUFC
 Warrnambool Plovers Rugby Union Club
 Wyndham City Rhinos RUC

Western Australia

Rugby Western Australia

RugbyWA Competition
 Arks Rugby Club
 Associates Rugby Club
 Bunbury Rugby Club
 Cottesloe Rugby Club
 Curtin University Rugby Union Football Club
 Joondalup Brothers RUFC
 Kalamunda Rugby Club
 Mandurah Rugby Club
 North Coast Rugby Union
 Midland Hills Rugby Club
 Nedlands Rugby Club
 Palmyra Rugby Club
 Perth Bayswater Rugby Club
 Rockingham Rugby Club
 Southern Lions RUFC
 University of Western Australia RUFC
 Wanneroo Rugby Club
 Wests Subiaco RUFC

WA Country RU

Eastern Goldfields WA Competition
 Boulder RUFC
 Bushwackers RUFC
 Esperance RUFC
 Kalgoorlie Stormers Rugby Club
 Kambalda RUFC

Great Southern Rugby Union
 Albany RUFC 
 Denmark Brothers RC
 Dryandra-Narrogin RUFC
 Katanning RC

Northern Division RU
 Geraldton Internationals RC
 Paraburdoo RC

South West WA Competition
 Bridgetown RUFC
 Bunbury City RUFC
 Collie RC
 Dunsborough RUFC
 Leeuwin-Margaret River RUFC

Other teams
Australian Police Rugby Union
Australian Schools Rugby Union

See also
 
List of cricket clubs in Australia
List of rowing clubs in Australia
List of yacht clubs in Australia
List of Australian rugby union stadiums by capacity
List of Australian club rugby union competitions

References

External links

 
 
 
 
 
 
 

 
Clubs
Rugby union
Rugby union